Starlight & Shadows is a series of novels by Elaine Cunningham, set in the Forgotten Realms campaign setting.

Plot summary
The Starlight & Shadows trilogy covers the adventures of the drow outcast Liriel Baenre and her companion, Fyodor of Rashemen.

Novels
 Daughter of the Drow (hardcover, August 1995, ; paperback, September 1996, ; paperback re-issue, February 2003)
 Tangled Webs (hardcover, April 1996, ; paperback, May 1998, ; paperback re-issue, March 2003)
 Windwalker (hardcover, April 2003, ; paperback, April 2004)
 
The Starlight & Shadows trilogy was later reprinted in:
 Starlight & Shadows Gift Set (three paperbacks in boxed slipcase, August 2005)

References

 

Fantasy novel series
Forgotten Realms novel series